Makan (Maqan) is a rural locality (a selo) and the administrative centre of Makansky Selsoviet, Khaybullinsky District, Bashkortostan, Russia. The population was 1,288 as of 2010. There are 12 streets.

Geography 
Makan is located 16 km southwest of Akyar (the district's administrative centre) by road. Mambetovo is the nearest rural locality.

References 

Rural localities in Khaybullinsky District